NuKernel is a microkernel which was developed at Apple Computer during the early 1990s. Written from scratch and designed using concepts from the Mach 3.0 microkernel, with extensive additions for soft real-time scheduling to improve multimedia performance, it was the basis for the Copland operating system. Only one NuKernel version was released, with a Copland alpha release. Development ended in 1996 with the cancellation of Copland.

The External Reference Specification (ERS) for NuKernel is contained in its entirety in its patent.

The one-time technical lead for NuKernel, Jeff Robbin, was one of the leaders of iTunes and the iPod.

Apple's NuKernel is not the microkernel in BeOS, nukernel.

See also
XNU, the microkernel in Mac OS X

References

Apple Inc. operating systems
Microkernels